Penicilloic acid is any of several acids which are obtained from the penicillins by the hydrolytic opening of the lactam ring (as by the action of a beta-lactamase).
Hypersensitivity is the most important adverse effect of the penicillins. The major antigenic determinant of penicillin hypersensitivity is its metabolite, penicilloic acid, which reacts with proteins and serves as a hapten to cause an immune reaction. 

Approximately five percent of patients have some kind of reaction, ranging from maculopapular rash (the most common rash seen with ampicillin hypersensitivity) to angioedema (marked swelling of the lips, tongue, and periorbital area) and anaphylaxis. Among patients with mononucleosis who are treated with ampicillin, the incidence of maculopapular rash approaches 100 percent. 

Cross-allergic reactions occur among the β-lactam antibiotics. To determine whether treatment with a β-lactam is safe when an allergy is noted, patient history regarding severity of previous reaction is essential.

References

Human drug metabolites
Thiazolidines
Dicarboxylic acids
Formamides
Secondary amino acids